Corrales del Vino is a municipality in the province of Zamora, Castile and León, Spain.

See also 
 Pablo Montesino Cáceres (1781–1849); born in Fuente el Carnero

References

Municipalities of the Province of Zamora